A phantom kangaroo is a report of kangaroos, wallabies, or their accompanying footprints in areas where there is no native population. Some explanations put forth are escaped zoo or circus animals (as in the UK), or publicity stunts by local businesses using photographs from Australia. Others suggest outbreaks of such sightings are a form of mass hysteria.

France
These wallabies are descended from a breeding population which escaped a zoological reserve in the 1970s.

Japan
Between 2002 and 2011, there was a series of phantom kangaroo sightings in the Mayama mountain district of Ōsaki, Miyagi city in Miyagi Prefecture.

New Zealand
In 1831, after arriving in Australia, two sailors from the Sydney Packet reported that they had seen a "giant kangaroo", 30 feet (nine metres) tall, at a small cove in Dusky Sound, South Island. From a small boat, they observed it standing near the treeline, and when they came too close the animal jumped into the water and swam away, leaving a wake extending from one end of the sound to the other.

Kawau Island in the Hauraki Gulf has a colony of three species of wallabies descending from a deliberate introduction by Sir George Grey, a 19th century Governor.

New Zealand also has a wild population of wallabies in the Waimate District of South Island that were introduced for hunting in the late 19th century.

United Kingdom
Documented colonies of red-necked wallabies exist in the United Kingdom. A breeding colony established itself after breaking loose from a private zoo in Leek, Staffordshire in the 1930s. Their population seems to have peaked in the 1970s, reaching numbers between 60 and 70. There were no confirmed sightings of the wallabies between 2000 and 2007, with some locals believing they must have died out. In 2009, newspapers reported wallaby sightings (including clear pictures) that made reference to sightings in 2008. In recent years, BBC News has documented numerous wallaby sightings across the UK.

Inchconnachan, an island in Loch Lomond in Scotland, also has a population of wallabies after they were introduced by Lady Arran Colquhoun in the 1920s.

Subsequent sightings have been made including a report of a Bennett’s wallaby filmed by zoologist Maurice Melzak in Highgate Cemetery, Hampstead, London in October 2013, and an albino wallaby in Northamptonshire in 2015.

United States
In 1934, near South Pittsburg, Tennessee, an atypical kangaroo or "kangaroo-like beast" was reported by several witnesses over a five-day period, and to have killed and partially devoured several animals, including ducks, geese, a German Shepherd and other dogs. Kangaroos are typically unaggressive and vegetarian. A witness described the animal as looking "like a large kangaroo, running and leaping across a field." A search party followed the animal's tracks to a mountainside cave where they stopped. The animal was never found, and national news coverage drew widespread ridicule.

In 1974, in Chicago, Illinois, two Chicago police officers were called to investigate a report that a kangaroo was standing in someone's porch. After a brief search, the officers located the animal in an alleyway, but were unable to capture it. Over the next month, numerous kangaroo sightings were reported in Illinois and the neighboring states of Indiana and Wisconsin, with timing suggesting more than one animal if reports were accurate. A kangaroo was seen the next day by a paperboy, the next week in Schiller Woods, Illinois, and the week after that just outside Plano, Illinois, reported by a police officer who said it jumped eight feet from a field into the road. Thirty minutes later, a kangaroo was reported back in Chicago, then reported on the following three days in the surrounding countryside. A few days later, there were a rash of sightings in Indiana. Reports ceased about a month after the original story.

In 1978, in Menomonee Falls, Wisconsin, two men photographed a large kangaroo beside the highway. Author Loren Coleman, described as the "leading authority on North American kangaroo sightings", suggested the animal looked like a Bennett's wallaby.

In 2013, in Oklahoma, a kangaroo was reportedly recorded by hunters in a field. The video was published on the website YouTube, and prompted speculation that the animal may be a pet kangaroo who went missing in the state just over a year earlier.

Also in 2013, The Ridgefield Press reported that a motorist in North Salem, New York captured on video what he thought was a kangaroo, and published the video on their website. The newspaper noted that escaped wallabies, smaller than kangaroos, were known in Westchester County, which encompasses North Salem. Several people in the county had kept wallabies as pets.

See also
 Forteana
 Phantom cat
 Vagrancy (biology)

References

Mythological marsupials
Macropods